Benjamin "Ben" Hebert (born March 16, 1983) is a Canadian curler, a Vancouver 2010 Winter Olympic gold medallist, 2008 World Champion and four time Brier Champion from Chestermere, Alberta.

In 2019, Hebert was named the greatest Canadian male lead in history in a TSN poll of broadcasters, reporters and top curlers.

Career
Hebert, originally from Regina, Saskatchewan, began curling during his school years. In 1998, he lead his high school team to compete in the finals for the city of Regina, ultimately losing to the group from Campbell Collegiate.

He played lead for Pat Simmons from 2003 to 2006, where he played in two Briers for Saskatchewan (2005 & 2006). The team finished 6-5 and 5-6 respectively. Hebert was also the 5th player on Team Canada, skipped by Steve Laycock, which won the World Junior Curling Championships in 2003.

Hebert moved to Alberta, and joined up briefly with the John Morris team. He then went with Morris later on in the year to play for Kevin Martin. With his new team, he won the Canada Cup in 2007 and finished fourth place at the 2007 Tim Hortons Brier. In 2008, Hebert was a part of the Alberta team that won the 2008 Tim Hortons Brier, and a member of Team Canada that won the 2008 World Men's Curling Championship. In 2009, Hebert was again the Lead for Team Alberta that repeated as 2009 Tim Hortons Brier Champions as they went 13-0 for the second consecutive Brier, and in the process set a new Brier record with most consecutive wins at 26.

Scandal broke out in their final round robin game at the 2009 Canadian Olympic Curling Trials against the Glenn Howard rink. Howard's third, Richard Hart, accused Hebert of an illegal brushing move in the 9th end. Replays show Hebert illegally lifting his broom off the ice in a vertical direction, instead of lifting it off to the side. This tactic is sometimes made to slow down a rock by dropping debris in front of the rock. Indeed, the rock he was sweeping was heavy, and Hebert's tactic may have caused the rock to veer off course slightly. Whether or not the act was intentional was left undiscovered.

Hebert and the rest of Team Martin went on to defeat Glenn Howard in the Final of the 2009 Canadian Olympic Curling Trials. Team Martin went on to represent Canada at the 2010 Winter Olympic Games in Vancouver, winning the gold medal after their 6-3 defeat of Thomas Ulsrud in the finals. Team Martin then capped an amazing 2009/2010 season by winning The Players Championship with an 8-7 extra end victory over Brad Gushue. Martin's team finished 2010 at the top of the WCT Money List with $139,750 and at the top of the WCT Order of Merit. Martin and co. capped the season with a 32-game winning streak.

Hebert and Team Martin won The National in December 2010.  In January 2011, Team Martin won the TSN Skins Game defeating Scotland's David Murdoch in the Final and earning $57,000 in the process.  They later defeated Kevin Koe in the Alberta Provincial Final and went on to finish 4th at the 2011 Tim Horton's Brier where Hebert was named a First Team All Star at Lead.  They capped the season with a win at the Players Championship.  With the win, Hebert and his team won the $25,000 first-place prize, plus took home a $50,000 bonus for winning the season-long Capital One Cup points race. The rink finished the season with $125,500 in prize money, second only to Winnipeg's Mike McEwen, who collected $127,490.

Personal life
Hebert is married and has two children. He is a Business Development Manager with Caltech Surveys Ltd, primarily an oil and gas land surveying company servicing Western Canada (BC, AB, SK, and MB). His cousins DJ and Dustin Kidby are also curlers, as is his uncle Brad Hebert.

Teams

References

External links

 "Regina-born curler Ben Hebert ready to make Olympic memories of his own", Leader-Post, Rob Vanstone, February 10, 2010
 "Interesting take on sweeping from Ben Hebert; and stop flopping, Andy Kapp!", Calgary Herald, Al Cameron, April 6, 2009
 "A Day in the Life with Canadian Olympian – Ben Hebert", Riley Moynes – Living Sky Media plus

Curlers from Alberta
Curlers from Regina, Saskatchewan
1983 births
Living people
World curling champions
Brier champions
Curlers at the 2010 Winter Olympics
Olympic curlers of Canada
Olympic gold medalists for Canada
Olympic medalists in curling
Medalists at the 2010 Winter Olympics
People from Rocky View County
Canadian male curlers
Continental Cup of Curling participants
Curlers at the 2018 Winter Olympics
Canada Cup (curling) participants